Teodora Džehverović (born on 10 February 1997) is a Serbian singer and television personality.

Early life and career 
Teodora Džehverović was born on 10 February 1997 in the South Banat village of Kačarevo to Serb mother and Bosniak father. By the end of primary school, she and her family moved to the nearby town Pančevo in order to support Teodora's ballet practices.

Džehverović rose to prominence as a contestant on the singing competition show Zvezde Granda in 2014. The show's producers then formed a girl group called Đavolice (She Devils), consisted of Džehverović and two other contestants: Tamara Milutinović and Gorana Babić. Together they released three songs: "Ćuti i vozi", "Piće za mladiće" (2015) and "Čokolada i vanila" (2016), before their breakup in 2016. Later that year, Džehverović pursued a solo career with her debut single "U 4 oka", released in December.

She gained more significant popularity by entering the first season of the reality television show Zadruga in September 2017. After ten months of competing, Džehverović finished as the second runner-up in June 2018. On 7 March 2019, she released her debut album Borbena under IDJTunes, which included two singles: "Kristijan Grej" (2017) and "Rari" featuring Coby (2018). 

In 2020, Teodora became the fifth Serbian woman to gross over million followers on Instagram. Her first solo online concerts was held in May the following year via Serbian streaming service YouBox. In 2022, Teodora was officially announced as a judge on the televised singing competition IDJShow alongside Relja Popović and Darko Dimitrov. That year, she also became Puma's brand ambassador in Serbia. In late August, Džehverović headlined the Belgrade Music Week Festival. Same year, she also performed at the New Year's Eve concert in front of the House of the National Assembly.

Discography

Studio albums

Singles

As lead artist

As featured artist

Promotional singles

Filmography

Awards and nominations

Notes

References

External links
 
 

Living people
1997 births
21st-century Serbian women singers
Serbian pop singers
Serbian folk-pop singers
Serbian people of Bosniak descent
People from Kačarevo